735 Marghanna (prov. designation:  or ) is a large carbonaceous background asteroid from the central regions of the asteroid belt, approximately  in diameter. It was discovered on 9 December 1912, by German astronomer Heinrich Vogt at the Heidelberg-Königstuhl State Observatory in southwest Germany. The dark C-type asteroid (Ch) has a rotation period of 20.6 hours and is rather regular in shape. It was named after Margarete Vogt and after Hanna, the mother and a relative of the discoverer, respectively.

Orbit and classification 

Marghanna is a non-family asteroid of the main belt's background population when applying the hierarchical clustering method to its proper orbital elements. It orbits the Sun in the central asteroid belt at a distance of 1.9–3.6 AU once every 4 years and 6 months (1,647 days; semi-major axis of 2.73 AU). Its orbit has an eccentricity of 0.32 and an inclination of 17° with respect to the ecliptic. The body's observation arc begins at Heidelberg Observatory on 29 November 1921, almost nine years after its official discovery observation.

Naming 

This minor planet was named by the discoverer Heinrich Vogt after his mother Margarete Vogt and after one of his relatives, Hanna. The  was mentioned in The Names of the Minor Planets by Paul Herget in 1955.

Physical characteristics 

In the Tholen classification and in the SDSS-based taxonomy, Marghanna is a common, carbonaceous C-type asteroid, while in the Bus–Binzel SMASS classification, it is a hydrated C-type (Ch).

Rotation period 

In May 2011, a rotational lightcurve of Marghanna was obtained from photometric observations by American astronomer Brian Skiff and collaborators using telescopes at the Lowell Observatory in Flagstaff, Arizona. The 2019-revised lightcurve analysis gave a well-defined rotation period of  hours with a small brightness variation of  magnitude, indicative of a rather spherical shape.

Diameter and albedo 

The Collaborative Asteroid Lightcurve Link derives an albedo of 0.0423 and a diameter of 74.23 kilometers based on an absolute magnitude of 9.7, while the Cornell Mid-IR Asteroid Spectroscopy (MIDAS) survey determined a diameter of  kilometers and Benoit Carry one of  kilometers.

These timed observations are taken when the asteroid passes in front of a distant star.

References

External links 
 Lightcurve Database Query (LCDB), at www.minorplanet.info
 Dictionary of Minor Planet Names, Google books
 Asteroids and comets rotation curves, CdR – Geneva Observatory, Raoul Behrend
 Discovery Circumstances: Numbered Minor Planets (1)-(5000) – Minor Planet Center
 
 

000735
Discoveries by Heinrich Vogt
Named minor planets
000735
000735
19121209